Blanchetia is a monotypic genus of flowering plants in the aster family, Asteraceae, containing the single species Blanchetia heterotricha. It is endemic to Brazil (states of Bahia, Alagoas, Paraíba, Pernambuco, and Sergipe).

Formerly included
Baccharis blanchetiana DC., Synonym of Piptocarpha lundiana (Less.) Baker

References

Vernonieae
Endemic flora of Brazil
Monotypic Asteraceae genera